This article lists the discography of American rock singer-songwriter Warren Zevon.

Albums

Studio albums

Live albums

Compilation albums

Singles

References

Rock music discographies
Discographies of American artists
Discography